The enzyme N-sulfoglucosamine-3-sulfatase (EC 3.1.6.15})  catalyzes cleaving off the 3-sulfate groups of the N-sulfo-D-glucosamine 3-O-sulfate units of heparin.

This enzyme belongs to the family of hydrolases, specifically those acting on sulfuric ester bonds.  The systematic nameis ''N''-sulfo-3-sulfoglucosamine 3-sulfohydrolase. This enzyme is also called chondroitinsulfatase.  This enzyme participates in the degradation of glycan structures.

References

EC 3.1.6
Enzymes of unknown structure